Abharak (also Romanized as Abhark) is a village in Adaran Rural District, Asara District, Karaj County, Alborz Province, Iran. At the 2006 census, its population was 378, in 95 families.

References 

Populated places in Karaj County